Ron McGowan (born 30 November 1945) is a former Australian rules footballer who played with Footscray in the Victorian Football League (VFL).

McGowan, a strong marking defender, was recruited from Hobart. Before that he had played for Longford in the Northern Tasmanian Football Association.

He spent eight seasons at Footscray and then finished his career in the South Australian National Football League, playing 21 games with South Adelaide.

References

1945 births
Australian rules footballers from Tasmania
Western Bulldogs players
South Adelaide Football Club players
Longford Football Club players
Hobart Football Club players
Living people